Pro Zombie Soccer is an iOS and Android game developed by Super Awesome Hyper Dimensional Mega Team and published by Chillingo in 2010.

Plot and Gameplay 
Pro Zombie Soccer's game play features a protagonist called Jax, a wannabe soccer star who is infected as a result of a zombie bite, from a soccer-playing zombie named Julinho from SC Marcelona. Players must quickly defeat hordes of zombies before Jax succumbs to the effects of the zombie infection.

Critical reception
The game has a Metacritic rating of 86% based on 11 critic reviews.

The game was selected as "App of the Week" and "Best of the Year," reaching a million downloads on all platforms.

SlideToPlay said, " Pro Zombie Soccer has surprising depth and variety for a game with such simple controls." No DPad said "Pro Zombie Soccer as a game is a must-have experience. The controls, game play, and artwork are just over the top, making this casual game one of the more intriguing." Modojo praised its "sharp visuals and satisfying gameplay". and AppSpy also expressed approval of the "fun storyline and varied game play". PocketGamerUK provided a glowing review as did TouchArcade which mentioned "an outstanding PvZ-stylized canvass of highly detailed, inked environments and characters." 

AppGamer provided a more mixed review, saying "With two different difficulty settings and Crystal support there's plenty of replay value ... only the slightly dodgy dialogue and bad humor stand in the way of making this a classic app." 148 Apps enjoyed the game "regardless of the far-fetched storyline and re-use of the app store cliché, Zombies." IGN gave a positive review and Multiplayer said: "the game is funny and intense, the touch controls work very well and the variety is guaranteed by the different kinds of enemies; the only big problem is that it lasts just about 2 hours."

Apocalypse Edition 
Pro Zombie Soccer Apocalypse Edition was released on 20 January 2011 for iPad. Advertised feature improvements included HD graphics, iPad-exclusive levels, social gaming support, re-designed levels and backgrounds and new unlockable modes.

Legacy 
As of 2022, the game is unavailable to purchase on the App Store and Google Play.

References

Android (operating system) games
IOS games
2009 video games
Video games about zombies
Association football video games
Video games developed in the United Kingdom
Chillingo games